The 2016–17 Azerbaijan Cup is the 25th season of the annual cup competition in Azerbaijan. The final is set to be played on 5 May 2017.

First round
The First Round games were drawn on 6 October 2016.

Second round
The two winners of the First Round will progress to the Second Round, which was also drawn on 6 October 2016.

Quarterfinals
The eight winners from the Second Round are drawn into four two-legged ties.

Semifinals
The four winners from the Quarterfinals were drawn into two two-legged ties.

Final

{| style="width:100%"
|-
|style="vertical-align:top;width:40%"|

|style="vertical-align:top; width:50%"|
{| cellspacing="0" cellpadding="0" style="font-size:90%; margin:auto"
|-
!width=25| !!width=25|
|-
|GK ||22'' ||  Dmytro Bezotosnyi
|-
|DF ||3 ||  Vojislav Stanković || 
|-
|DF ||34||  Urfan Abbasov
|-
|MF ||6 ||  Rashad Sadiqov
|-
|MF ||14||  Javid Huseynov
|-
|MF ||27||  Theo Weeks || || 
|-
|MF ||77||  Araz Abdullayev || || 
|-
|MF ||7 ||  Nika Kvekveskiri
|-
|MF ||19||  Filip Ozobić
|-
|MF ||88||  Tellur Mutallimov || || 
|-
|FW ||9 ||  Sergei Zenjov
|-
|colspan="3"|Substitutes:|-
|GK ||33||  Dawid Pietrzkiewicz
|-
|FW ||10||  Ruslan Qurbanov
|-
|MF ||11||  Asif Mammadov
|-
|DF ||17||  Magomed Mirzabekov || || 
|-
|FW ||18||  Bagaliy Dabo || || 
|-
|MF ||21||  Roman Huseynov || || 
|-
|DF ||44||  Rafael Santos
|-
|colspan=3|Manager:|-
|colspan=4| Roman Hryhorchuk
|}
|}

Scorers4 goals: Namig Alasgarov - Qarabağ
 Dino Ndlovu - Qarabağ3 goals: Danijel Subotić - Gabala
 Rauf Aliyev - Inter Baku
 Pessalli - Neftchi Baku
 Mahir Madatov - Qarabağ
 Amil Yunanov - Sumgayit2 goals: Mirzaga Huseynpur - AZAL
 David Janelidze - AZAL
 Filip Ozobić - Gabala
 Ruslan Abışov - Inter Baku
 Joshgun Diniyev - Qarabağ
 Rahman Musayev - Turan Tovuz1 goals: Shirmammad Mammadov - AZAL
 Rashad Eyyubov - Gabala
 Asif Mammadov - Gabala
 Ruslan Qurbanov - Gabala
 Bagaliy Dabo - Gabala
 Vojislav Stanković - Gabala
 Aghabala Ramazanov - Inter Baku
 Nizami Hajiyev - Inter Baku
 Adrian Scarlatache - Inter Baku
 Orkhan Aliyev - Kapaz
 Shahriyar Rahimov - Kapaz
 Tural Gurbatov - Kapaz
 Tural Rzayev - Kapaz
 Jeyhun Javadov - Kapaz
 Fahmin Muradbayli - Neftchi Baku
 Magsad Isayev - Neftchi Baku
 Rahil Mammadov - Neftchi Baku
 Rahid Amirguliyev - Qarabağ
 Vüqar Nadirov - Qarabağ
 Richard - Qarabağ
 Míchel - Qarabağ
 Dani Quintana - Qarabağ
 Muarem Muarem - Qarabağ
 Mahammad Aliyev - Qaradağ Lökbatan
 Rufet Mammadov - Qaradağ Lökbatan
 Bakhtiyar Soltanov - Qaradağ Lökbatan
 Hagverdi Hasanov - Shahdag Qusar
 S.Baleljae - Shamkir
 Magomed Kurbanov - Sumgayit
 Tugay Alhüseynli - Turan Tovuz
 S.Abdullayev - Zagatala
 Oruc Balaşlı - Zagatala
 Aleksandr Shemonayev - Zira
 Nurlan Novruzov - Zira
 Milan Đurić - ZiraOwn goals:'''
 Tapdıq Əliyev (12 October 2016 vs Turan Tovuz)
 Urfan Abbasov (5 May 2017 vs Qarabağ)

References

Azerbaijan Cup seasons
Azerbaijan
Cup